DJ Pari, born Markus Schmidt, is a German-American DJ, producer and journalist. He is mostly known for his collaborations with Soul legends like Marva Whitney, Gwen McCrae, Lyn Collins, The Impressions and James Brown amongst others.

Life
DJ Pari is the son of former professional footballer Walter Schmidt. Born in Braunschweig, Germany, he began DJing at age 15. In 1994, he moved to the United States, first to Phoenix, Arizona, where he spent two years running a club night called The Hip Joint. In 1995 he re-located to Los Angeles, California, where he played the club circuit and worked with acts like the Solsonics, Mandrill (band), The Black Eyed Peas, Big Black, Roy Porter (drummer) and many others. Around the same time he began opening shows for the Godfather of Soul James Brown and even toured with him for quite some time.

In 1998, DJ Pari moved back to Germany and launched his Soulpower organization at the Palo Palo club in Hannover, Germany. Originally just a monthly soul party, Soulpower quickly evolved into a global project and booking agency, producing more than 400 shows and parties in more than 20 countries and 50 cities on four continents. Some of the artists DJ Pari has worked with under the Soulpower banner are Marva Whitney, Gwen McCrae, Lyn Collins, Bobby Byrd, Maceo Parker, Fred Wesley, Vicki Anderson, Pee Wee Ellis, Roy Ayers, Bootsy Collins, Clyde Stubblefield, John "Jabo" Starks, Sharon Jones, Sweet Charles Sherrell, Karl Denson, and RAMP.

DJ Pari's musical productions include I am what I am, the 2006 album by Marva Whitney, and her singles "I am what I am" and "Soulsisters (of the world unite)" as well as Mama Feelgood by Lyn Collins and Live in Paris by Gwen McCrae. Pari has also worked with Japanese Funk outfit Osaka Monaurail, co-writing for and co-producing several of the group's albums.

Since his move to Richmond, Virginia in 2007, DJ Pari has collaborated with funk pioneer Sir Joe Quarterman and Chicago soul legend Leroy Hutson, managing the singer's 2010 European tour. That same year, he assumed management duties for The Impressions of Curtis Mayfield fame, producing several tours in the United States, Europe and Japan for the group. In July 2012, he DJed with the Impressions at the Curtis Mayfield 70th Birthday Tribute at Lincoln Center in New York, a show that also featured Mavis Staples, William Bell, the Roots and other soul legends. DJ Pari also introduced the Impressions to Binky Griptite, guitarist and MC of Sharon Jones & The Dap-Kings, a relationship that produced the group's first single in more than 30 years. In 2016, he arranged a meeting of the Impressions with President Barack Obama at the White House.

In Richmond, DJ Pari was the co-host of the Soulpower party series and of the weekly radio show Midnight Soulstice on WRIR-LP.

In 2013, the film documentary Power of Soul, produced by DJ Pari, screened at the Cannes Film Festival and at several festivals and theaters in Germany. The documentary features original footage and Pari's interviews with artists like James Brown, Bobby Byrd, Vicki Anderson, Marva Whitney, The Pharcyde, Kurtis Blow, George McCrae and many others.

In 2017, Marva Whitney's "I am what I am," co-written and produced by DJ Pari, was licensed by Ford for the TV commercial promoting the 2017 Ford Explorer titled "For Those With Their Own Path." That same year, DJ Pari co-produced the album Tribute to my Soul Sisters by former James Brown backing vocalist Martha High with Osaka Monaurail.

DJ Pari is currently working as a music journalist, under his real name, and editor in Richmond.

Discography (as producer or co-producer)

Albums
 Soulpower - The Best of Year One (Soulpower Records, 2005)
 Gwen McCrae - Live in Paris (Hi&Fly, 2005)
 Lyn Collins - Mama Feelgood (Hi&Fly, 2006)
 Marva Whitney - I am what I am (Shout!, 2006)
 Marva Whitney - Marva Whitney with her own Osaka Monaurail - Live in Japan (Shout!, 2006)
 Undercover Express - Introducing Undercover Express (P-Vine, 2007)
 Osaka Monaurail - Amen, Brother! (Unique, 2007)
 Osaka Monaurail - Live in Spain (Shout!, 2009) 
 Osaka Monaurail - State Of The World (Unique, 2011)
 DJ Pari - What It Is? (Soulpower, 2012)
 Osaka Monaurail - Osaka Monaurail Performs Riptide and Other Readings from the Book of Funk (Unique, 2014)
 Martha High - Tribute to My Soul Sisters (Recordkicks, 2018)

Singles
 Marva Whitney - I am what I am P. 1 / I am what I am P. 2 (Shout!, 2006)
 Marva Whitney - Soulsisters (Of the World Unite / It's her Thing (Shout!, 2006) 
 Marva Whitney - I am what I am / Give it Up Turnit A Loose (12") (Freestyle, 2007)
 Osaka Monaurail - Signed, Sealed, Delivered I'm Yours / Supershine #9 (Our Label Records, 2008)
 Osaka Monaurail - Hung Up (vocal) / Hung Up (instr.) (Unique, 2009)
 Osaka Monaurail - Tighten Up / Soulful Strut (Unique, 2009)
 Osaka Monaurail - No Trouble on the Mountain (feat. Shirley Davis / The Archipelago (Unique, 2011)
 Martha High - A Little Taste of Soul / Unwind Yourself (Record Kicks, 2018)

Filmography
 Power of Soul (Marctropolis, 2013)

References

External links
Jazz Collectors of Instagram: DJ Pari
Our Label Records interview with DJ Pari
Article in RVA Magazine about DJ Pari
Big Up - 10 Questions with Dj Pari on Fleamarket Funk blog
DJ Pari Funk mix on German Testspiel blog
Article in Sueddeutsche Zeitung
Richmond news coverage
Neue Presse Interview with DJ Pari
Soul Power at Weezie's
Review of "The Power of Soul" documentary
Interview with Braunschweiger Zeitung

Living people
1975 births
Musicians from Braunschweig
American DJs
German DJs
Electronic dance music DJs